HMS Imaum (sometimes referred to as Imaun) was a 76-gun third rate ship of the line of the Royal Navy. She was built in Bombay as Liverpool, and launched on 10 November 1826 for the Imaum of Muscat, Said bin Sultan, who presented the ship to the Royal Navy on 9 March 1836.

She was placed on harbour service at Port Royal, Jamaica in 1842, and was broken up in 1863.

Imaums figurehead is preserved in the Maritime Museum of the Atlantic at Halifax, Nova Scotia, Canada.

Notes

References

 Lavery, Brian (2003) The Ship of the Line - Volume 1: The development of the battlefleet 1650-1850. Conway Maritime Press. .

Ships of the line of the Royal Navy
British ships built in India
1826 ships